Burlingame State Park is a public recreation area located in the town of Charlestown, Rhode Island. The state park's  offer camping, hiking, and water activities on Watchaug Pond. The park's campground abuts the Burlingame Management Area and Kimball Wildlife Sanctuary.

History
Following the lead of the Audubon Society, which in 1927 had established the Kimball Wildlife Sanctuary, a  property on the southern shore of Watchaug Pond, the State Parks Commission acquired land around the pond beginning in 1930. The park was named for the commission's longtime chair, Edwin A. Burlingame, and opened as a campground in 1934. During the 1930s, it was the primary base of operations for the Rhode Island activities of the Civilian Conservation Corps. The Audubon Society sold Kimball Wildlife Refuge to the Rhode Island Department of Environmental Management in 2015 and it is now part of the park.

Natural features
Mammals observed at the park include deer, rabbits, muskrat, mink, foxes, otters and weasels.  Up to 80 bird species nest in the park, and many more pass through during migration season. Reptiles and amphibians include frogs, salamanders, Eastern box turtles and the non-venomous northern water snake.

Activities and amenities
The park features camping, picnicking, swimming, fishing, and a boat-launch ramp. Hiking trails connect the campground and the Kimball Wildlife Sanctuary. The campground's  include 713 campsites (including 20 cabins and one shelter), a camp store, freshwater beach, and canoe rentals. The park's northern area along the Pawcatuck River is used primarily for hunting.

References

External links
Burlingame State Park Rhode Island Department of Environmental Management 
Burlingame State Campground Rhode Island Department of Environmental Management 
Burlingame State Park Picnic Area Rhode Island Department of Environmental Management Division of Parks & Recreation

State parks of Rhode Island
Charlestown, Rhode Island
Protected areas of Washington County, Rhode Island
Protected areas established in 1930
1930 establishments in Rhode Island
Civilian Conservation Corps in Rhode Island